The Kyrgyz ambassador in Beijing is the official representative of the Government in Bishkek to the Government of the People's Republic of China and concurrently accredited as ambassador in Ulaanbaatar (Mongolia), Bangkok(Thailand) and Singapore.

List of representatives

References 

 
China
Kyrgyzstan